The High Point Panthers men's basketball team is the basketball team that represents High Point University in High Point, North Carolina in NCAA Division I competition. The school's team competes in the Big South Conference.

Coaches

Current coaching staff
 Head Coach - G. G. Smith
 Asst. Coach - Keith Gatlin
 Asst. Coach - Eric Gabriel

Former head coaches
Tubby Smith (2018-2022)
Scott Cherry (2009-2018) 
Bart Lundy (2003–09)
 Jerry Steele (1972-2003)
 J.D. Barnett (1971–72)
 Bob Vaughn (1966–71)
 Thomas Quinn (1962–66)
 Bob Davis (1950–53)
 Ralph James (1945–50)
 Virgil Yow (1933–45, 1953–62)
 Julian Beall (1931–33)
 J.P. Boylin (1927–31)

Postseason
The Panthers have yet to make an appearance in the NCAA Division I tournament.

NCAA Division II tournament results
The Panthers have appeared in the NCAA Division II tournament two times. Their combined record is 2–2.

NIT results
The Panthers have appeared in the National Invitation Tournament (NIT) two times. Their record is 0–2.

CIT results
The Panthers have appeared in the CollegeInsider.com Postseason Tournament (CIT) two times. Their record is 1–2.

NAIA tournament results
The Panthers have appeared in the NAIA tournament seven times. Their combined record is 7–7.

Seasons

References

External links
Website